The Rosset is a breed of domestic sheep from the Valle d'Aosta in north-west Italy. It is morphologically similar to the Savoiarda breed from Piemonte and to the Thônes et Marthod breed from Savoie; it may have been influenced also by the Blanc des Alpes and the Biellese.  It is one of the forty-two autochthonous local sheep breeds of limited distribution for which a herdbook is kept by the Associazione Nazionale della Pastorizia, the Italian national association of sheep-breeders.

In 2013 the total number recorded for the breed was 919.

References

Sheep breeds originating in Italy